Linesøy Bridge is a cantilever bridge and causeway which connects the islands of Linesøya and Stokkøya in Åfjord, Norway. The bridge opened on 7 October 2011 and replaced the Kjerkholmen–Linesøy Ferry.

References

External links
 Website of the building project

Road bridges in Trøndelag
Åfjord
Bridges completed in 2011
2011 establishments in Norway